Bon Secours is a not-for-profit Marriottsville, Maryland-based Catholic health system founded in 1983 that owns, manages, or joint ventures 19 acute care hospitals, one psychiatric hospital, five nursing care facilities, four assisted living facilities and 14 home care and hospice programs in seven US states.

On September 1, 2018, Bon Secours and Mercy Health combined to become the United States’ fifth largest Catholic health care ministry and one of the nation's 20 largest health care systems. The two systems and their hospitals retained their pre-merger names and branding. The full name of the combined health system is Bon Secours Mercy Health. Bon Secours Mercy Health headquarters are co-located with Mercy Health in Cincinnati, Ohio.

Background
The Congregation of the Sisters of Bon Secours was established in 1824 in Paris, France. Their particular apostolate was providing in-home care for the sick and dying. In 1881, the sisters came to Baltimore at the request of James Cardinal Gibbons. They founded their first hospital in Baltimore in 1919. By 1980, they had founded or managed several more. Bon Secours was established in 1983 to coordinate the administration and management of the various healthcare facilities.

Throughout the 1980s, the Bon Secours grew rapidly, opening a number of hospitals, community health clinics, nursing care facilities for the elderly, alcohol and drug abuse rehabilitation centers, affordable housing units, and medical office facilities in Maryland, Virginia, Florida, and Michigan in response to the needs of the communities they served.

Hospitals

South Carolina

Bon Secours St. Francis Downtown Hospital, Greenville
Bon Secours St. Francis Eastside Hospital, Greenville

Virginia

Bon Secours DePaul Medical Center, Norfolk
Bon Secours Health Center at Harbour View, Suffolk
Bon Secours Mary Immaculate Hospital, Newport News
Bon Secours Maryview Medical Center, Portsmouth
Bon Secours Maryview Behavioral Medicine Center, Portsmouth
Bon Secours Memorial Regional Medical Center, Mechanicsville
Bon Secours St. Francis Medical Center, Midlothian
Bon Secours St. Mary's Hospital, Richmond
Bon Secours Richmond Community Hospital, Richmond
Bon Secours Southside Medical Center, Petersburg

Former facilities

Kentucky 

 Our Lady of Bellefonte Hospital (OLBH), Ashland, KY

Maryland 
 Grace Medical Center, Baltimore — known as Bon Secours Hospital from 1919 until its sale in 2019

Massachusetts 
 Bon Secours Hospital, Methuen, Opened in 1950, was sold to Caritas Christi Health Care in 1988, and renamed Holy Family Hospital

Michigan 

 Bon Secours Grosse Pointe sold in the early 2000’s to Beaumont Health System

Pennsylvania 

 Bon Secours-Holy Family Hospital, Altoona — merged into Altoona Regional Health System in 2004, closed 2012.

References

External links
 Bon Secours
 Bon Secours Mercy Health

Bon Secours Sisters
Catholic health care
Catholic hospitals in North America
Healthcare in Virginia
Marriottsville, Maryland
Hospital networks in the United States
Medical and health organizations based in Maryland
Catholic hospital networks in the United States